Antonio Pereira "Tufy" Pina Neto (born March 26, 1989), better known as Tufy Pina,  is a Brazilian footballer who currently plays for Udon United in Thai League 3.

References

External links
 Tufy Pina at playmakerstats.com (English version of ogol.com.br)

1989 births
Living people
Association football midfielders
Brazilian expatriate footballers
Brazilian expatriate sportspeople in Thailand
Tufy Pina
Tufy Pina
Tufy Pina
Tufy Pina
Brazilian footballers
Expatriate footballers in Thailand
Tufy Pina
Place of birth missing (living people)